Ab Tut may refer to:
 Abtut, Fars
 Ab Tut, Kohgiluyeh and Boyer-Ahmad